The Order of the Patriotic War is a Soviet military decoration that was awarded to all soldiers in the Soviet armed forces, security troops, and to partisans for heroic deeds during the German-Soviet War, known since the mid-1960s in the former Soviet Union as the Great Patriotic War.

History 
The Order was established on 20 May 1942 and came in first class and second class depending upon the merit of the deed. It was the first Soviet order established during the war, and the first Soviet order divided into classes. Its statute precisely defined, which deeds are awarded with the order, e.g. shooting down three aircraft as a fighter pilot, or destroying two heavy or three medium or four light tanks, or capturing a warship, or repairing an aircraft under fire after landing on a hostile territory, and so on, were awarded with the first class. It was also given to some allied troops and commanders, including western allies. All together, over 324,903 of the 1st class and 951,652 of the 2nd class were issued during the war. Until 1985, the total number reached about 1,370,000.

In 1985, during the celebration of the 40th anniversary of Victory Day, it was decided that all surviving veterans of the war would be awarded either 2nd or 1st class of the Order, and about 2,054,000 first class and 5,408,000 second class were issued then.

As of January 1992, the total number of all awarded Orders was 2,487,098 first class and 6,688,497 second class variants. The award continues to he featured heavily at Russia's annual Victory Day parades.

Design 
It featured a red enamel five-pointed star, made of silver, with straight rays in the background, and crossed sabre and a  Mosin rifle. The rays in the background were golden for 1st Class and silver for 2nd Class. The central disc had a golden hammer and sickle on a red enamel background, surrounded by a white enamel ring with the words ОТЕЧЕСТВЕННАЯ ВОЙНА ("Patriotic War"). Originally the Order was attached to a plain red ribbon much like the Gold Star award, but from June 1943 the Order was to be worn on the right chest without ribbon; on less formal occasions a ribbon bar, dark red with a bright red central stripe for the 1st Class, or dark red with bright red edge stripes for the 2nd Class, may be worn instead.

Anniversary orders of 1985 were made cheaper, as a single silver piece, gold-plated in the 1st class.

References

External links 

 Description of the order 
  Указ Президиума Верховного Совета «Об учреждении Ордена Отечественной войны первой и второй степени» от 20 мая 1942 года // Ведомости Верховного Совета Союза Советских Социалистических Республик : газета. — 1942. — 28 мая (№ 19 (178)). — С. 1.

Military awards and decorations of the Soviet Union
Military awards and decorations of World War II
Awards established in 1942
1942 establishments in the Soviet Union
Military awards and decorations of Russia